Sylvester Williams may refer to:
Sylvester Williams (American football), American football player
Sly Williams, Sylvester "Sly" Williams, basketball player
Sylvester Williams (actor), played Mick McFarlane in EastEnders
Henry Sylvester Williams, Trinidadian barrister, British local government councillor, and Pan-African campaigner